Kurosaki may refer to:

People with the surname
, Japanese former football player and manager
, Japanese singer and songwriter
, Japanese woman murdered in France
, Japanese rower
, Japanese actress, tarento, and fashion model
Ryan Kurosaki (born 1952), American former baseball player

Fictional characters
Ichigo Kurosaki, a character in Bleach 
Isshin Kurosaki, a character in Bleach
Masaki Kurosaki, a character in Bleach
Karin Kurosaki, a character in Bleach
Yuzu Kurosaki, a character in Bleach 
Mea Kurosaki, a character in To Love-Ru Darkness 
Tasuku Kurosaki, a character from the Dengeki Daisy manga series
Miu Kurosaki, a character in The King of Fighters universe
Miki Kurosaki, a character in the Digimon Data Squad
Sayoko Kurosaki and daughter Asami Kurosaki, characters in Mahoraba 
Hisoka Kurosaki, a character in Descendants of Darkness 
Shun Kurosaki and sister Ruri Kurosaki in Yu-Gi-Oh! Arc-V
Haruto Kurosaki, a character in Defying Kurosaki-kun
Sakura Kurosaki, a character in Defying Kurosaki-kun

Places
Kurosaki, Niigata, a former town from Nishikanbara District in Niigata, Japan

See also
Kurosaki Station, a railway station in Japan

Japanese-language surnames